Twinning (making a twin of) may refer to:

 In biology and agriculture, producing two offspring (i.e., twins) at a time, or having a tendency to do so;
 Twin towns and sister cities, towns and cities involved in town twinning  
 Twinning institutional building tool
 eTwinning, an EU collaboration project in which two schools in different locations are paired and communicate using the internet
 Afri Twin, an exchange partnership between schools in the United Kingdom and South Africa
 Twinning (roads), construction of one road next to another
 In crystallography, crystal twinning refers to intergrown crystal forms that display a twin boundary
 In film, special effects that multiply the presence of the same actor or actress on screen
 In animation, twinning refers to when two parts on opposite sides of a character's body move the same way
 A type of transnational education in which a student does part of their degree course in a local private college and part of it in an overseas institution tied to the college
 Twinning (TV series), a 2015 reality show on VH1

See also
Twining (disambiguation)